Grabus (also Grabos; ; ruled c. 358 – 356 BC) was an Illyrian king who reigned in southern Illyria in the 4th century BC.

Biography 

According to a historical reconstruction, Grabus belonged to the Grabaei, an Illyrian tribe mentioned by Pliny the Elder (23–79 AD), although the tribe may have been incorporated into the Taulantii realm of which Grabus became king. It has been further conjectured that after Philip II of Macedon defeated Bardylis (c. 358 BC), the Grabaei, under Grabus, became the most powerful tribe in Illyria.

In 356 BC, Athens formed an alliance with Grabus, Paeonian king Lyppeius, and Thracian king Cetriporis against Philip. Some months later the three northern kings were defeated by Philip's general Parmenion, while the Athenians were otherwise engaged in the Aegean Sea.

See also 
 List of rulers of Illyria

References

Bibliography 

Illyrian kings
4th-century BC rulers
Year of birth unknown
Year of death unknown